The S sets were a class of electric multiple units that operated on Sydney's suburban rail network from 1972 up until 2019. Originally entering service under the Public Transport Commission, the sets also operated under the State Rail Authority, CityRail and Sydney Trains. Prior to their retirement, the S sets were the last class in the Sydney Trains fleet to not be air-conditioned, earning them the nicknames "Tin cans" and "Sweat Sets". They were also nicknamed "Ridgys" because of their fluted ("ridged") stainless steel panelling; they shared this nickname with similar looking K sets and C sets. The final sets were withdrawn from service in June 2019.

Delivery

Two manufacturers built 509 carriages, based on a largely common design:

359 carriages were built by Comeng between 1972 & 1980. They were externally distinguished by the peaked front of driving cars and a prominent line across each side of its carriages above the upper deck windows. They also had thin flutings at the top and upper half of the sides of the carriages.
The Series 1 Comeng power cars featured no fluting on the lower half of the carriage and one peaked front and rear end.
The Series 2/3 Comeng power cars featured fluting on the lower half of the carriage and one peaked front end. These two types were identical aesthetically. 
The Series 4 Comeng power cars were identical to the Series 2/3 cars with headlights fitted above the destination box.
Cars D4011–D4020 featured the driver/guard window and vertical window close together with no pantograph. These carriages also lacked a driver/guard doors and had no destination boxes.
Cars D4021-D4095 featured the same as a Comeng power car with a driver/guard door with no pantograph. These cars had no destination boxes.
All 85 driving trailers were converted into trailer cars with the driving compartment, cab and guard instruments removed with head and tail lights plated over.

150 carriages built by A Goninan & Co between 1978 & 1980. They were externally distinguished by the flat front of driving cars and lower windows on the upper deck. They also had larger windows at the end between carriages. They also had thicker flutings at the top and around the top of the carriages and lacked the line around the top of the sides of the carriages unlike the Comeng carriages.

History

In service

Following the successful trial of four double-deck power cars built by Tulloch in 1968, 53 Series 1 power cars were ordered from Comeng and delivered in 1972–73. They were paired with 1965–67 Tulloch-built trailer carriages that had previously operated in company with single deck power cars. The first 39 were painted tuscan to match the trailer cars while the last 14 were painted in the newly introduced Public Transport Commission blue and white livery.From 1976, the blue and white livery was replaced by an Indian red livery. In 1979, painted Series 1 cars began to have their paint removed to match the Series 2 cars. Only seven were completed, and it wasn't until August 1988 that the program recommenced with the last carriage treated in 1990.

Subsequent orders saw another 154 power cars, 67 trailer cars and 85 driving trailer cars built by Comeng. These were all built to the Series 2 design with Budd type polished inserts on the carriage sides, flat rather than tapered number 2 ends, throw-over rather than sliding reversible seats, upgraded interior lights and a natural stainless steel finish.

A further order saw 80 power cars and 70 trailer cars constructed by A Goninan & Co in 1978–80. These cars differed in having a squarer type of fluting and flat fronts on the power cars.

All were formed into either four-car S sets or two-car T sets. In practice, there were only a few diagrams requiring two carriage sets resulting in most T sets being used to form six and eight-car sets. By the early 1980s, some permanent six-car sets had been formed and targeted as R sets. In December 1983 there were 60 T sets, 12 months later this was down to 19.

In April 1982, ten driving trailers were introduced on local services between Scarborough and Port Kembla. These two car PK sets ran until the line was electrified in December 1985. They were hauled by 48 class diesels but because of incompatibility between the electrical systems, the guard operated doors were disconnected.

From June 1984, four three-car sets of Goninan stock operated suburban services from Newcastle to Fassifern and Morisset as NC sets. This stock was allocated to Mortdale and periodically rotated. In August 1989, this was reduced to two sets. In September 1989, the remaining NC sets were replaced by two carriage L sets from Hornsby. These were replaced in January 1992.

In May 1987, the ten newest driving trailers based at Hornsby were renumbered D4001–D4010 and the remainder began to have their control equipment removed and revert to ordinary trailers. To allow the Tangaras to be targeted as T sets, the remaining two-car sets became L sets in April 1988. When refurbished in the 1990s the crew compartments were removed.

To operate services on the newly electrified Riverstone to Richmond line from August 1991, all 10 driving trailers and a number of Series 1 power cars were fitted with headlights.

From October 1996, two-car L sets replaced U sets on suburban services between Thirroul, Port Kembla and Kiama. These were later extended to three cars before being replaced by Tangaras in October 2011.

During the 1990s, all carriages were refurbished as part of the CityDecker program. This saw the interiors refurbished with white walls and ceilings, grey floors and blue seats. Power cars received a destination indicator and had yellow applied to the lower half of their fronts. Sliding Beclawat windows were replaced with hopper windows and doors painted yellow.

Replacement

After nearly 40 years of service, the Tulloch trailers were deemed life expired and the last withdrawn in March 2004. This resulted in a disproportionate number of power cars. To address the balance, 23 Comeng power cars were converted into trailers. Most of the conversions were Series 1 cars, however a few conversions involved Series 2 cars. This involved the removal of the yellow painted front (on some cars), pantograph and opening up of the driving compartment for passengers. Some cars had their external lights removed and plated over, and their cabs removed, other retained these fittings. All retained their motors and compressors for ballast purposes. The destination indicators were also retained as it would have cost too much to have them removed; they were painted over instead. These cars are easy to recognise as they have an open space where the pantograph once was.

During their history, S sets operated on all Sydney lines. The last six car R sets were deemed life expired in August 2012, with all carriages formed into four car S sets (which were typically operated in pairs). The last sets were transferred from Mortdale to Flemington in March 2013 bringing an end to their operation on Eastern Suburbs & Illawarra services. However, one set remained operational through parts of March and April on the line. In May 2014, all Hornsby sets were transferred to Flemington.

All remaining 498 carriages were to be replaced by A sets from 2012, with the last scheduled for replacement in 2015. In March 2013, it was revealed that forty eight S sets would need to be retained after the full introduction of the A sets, as the option to build further A sets had lapsed, meaning no trains had been ordered for the South West Rail Link. The last Series 1 power car was withdrawn in January 2014. The final A set was delivered in June 2014. Following the delivery of the final A sets, Sydney Trains retained 48 four-car sets (192 carriages).

In June 2014, the government announced that all timetabled services except those on the T7 Olympic Park shuttle, would be operated by air-conditioned trains. With the introduction of a new timetable in November 2017, 40 four car sets were temporarily required to operate the weekday service, while the B sets were delivered. This meant that S sets would once again be scheduled to operate services on all lines in Sector 2.

Final days
The remaining forty eight S sets were gradually replaced by twenty four eight-carriage B set trains throughout the course of 2018 and 2019, with 14 S set carriages being retained for heritage purposes. Six S sets were initially kept for emergencies but sufficient availabilities of other air-conditioned rolling stock ultimately deemed this redundant. The new B sets replaced timetabled K set runs, while the K sets moved on to S set runs. The remaining S sets were mostly phased out by the end of April 2019, with the introduction of an updated timetable of the Sydney Trains network. All of the final sets were withdrawn by June 2019.

On 27 June 2019, Transport Minister Andrew Constance joined Sydney Trains Chief Executive Howard Collins and rail employees on a farewell run from Central Station across the Sydney Harbour Bridge to Lavender Bay. The last timetabled S set service ran on the following night, on 28 June 2019, on the T7 Olympic Park Line. Two public farewell events were held on Sunday 21 July 2019. The final revenue S set service was a special charter on the afternoon of 21 July, organised by the Sydney Electric Train Society and operated in conjunction with Transport Heritage NSW and Sydney Trains.

During their final days S sets operated on the following lines:

 T2 Inner West and Leppington Line: Leppington/Parramatta to City via Granville
 T3 Bankstown Line: Liverpool/Lidcombe to City via Bankstown
 T6 Carlingford Line: Clyde to Carlingford
 T7 Olympic Park Line: Lidcombe To Olympic Park
 T8 Airport and South Line: Macarthur To City via Airport/Sydenham

Preservation 

*SPx is denoted on internal fleet lists as of circa June 2016. L1 has been seen around 2018 when HET acquired the cars, however presently no setplates are worn.

In popular culture 

 Many of the scenes in the music video of the 2020 single Old Me, by pop-rock band 5 Seconds of Summer, were filmed inside an S set carriage

References

External links

Technical drawings and specifications (archived) Transport for NSW

Double-decker EMUs
Electric multiple units of New South Wales
Sydney Trains
Train-related introductions in 1972
1500 V DC multiple units of New South Wales